is a passenger railway station located in the town of Minami, Kaifu District, Tokushima Prefecture, Japan. It is operated by JR Shikoku and has the station number "M21".

Lines

Layout
Hiwasa Station consists of a side platform and an island platform serving two tracks. A passing loop runs on the other side of the island platform. In addition, a siding branches off track 1, ending near the station building. The station building is located on the east side of the tracks and houses a waiting room as well as a local tourist information office. The ticket window is unstaffed but some types of tickets are sold by a kan'i itaku agent at a shop for local products/tourist information office located at the Hiwasa Road Station on the west side of the tracks. Access to the island platform is by means of a level crossing or a metal footbridge. Both also lead to a second station entrance on the west side, within the compound of the Hiwasa Road Station.

Adjacent stations

History
On 1 April 1987, with the privatization of Japanese National Railways (JNR), the successor of JGR, JR Shikoku took over control of the station.

Surrounding area
Hiwasa Road Station - a highway service station located at the west entrance of the railway station. Among its facilities is a centre exhibiting and selling local products which also incorporates a post office and a tourism information centre and which also sells some types of JR rail tickets.

Passenger statistics
In fiscal 2019, the station was used by an average of 320 passengers daily

Surrounding area
Minami Town Hall
Yakuo-ji

See also
 List of Railway Stations in Japan

References

External links

JR Shikoku timetable 

Railway stations in Tokushima Prefecture
Railway stations in Japan opened in 1939
Minami, Tokushima